was a Japanese civil rights activist. In spite of social and legal barriers, he directly challenged three major barriers against Asians in the United States: citizenship, joining a profession, and owning land.

Biography
Yamashita was born in Yawatahama, Ehime, Shikoku, Japan. He immigrated to the United States in the 1890s and, aided by a photographic memory, graduated from Tacoma High School in two years before entering University of Washington law school's second graduating class. Yamashita graduated with a law degree from the University of Washington in 1902 and passed the state bar exam with distinction.

The Washington State Supreme Court, in processing his bar application, issued an order expressing "doubt whether a native of Japan is entitled under naturalization laws to admission to citizenship."  Yamashita appealed the order, representing himself before the Washington Supreme Court. Despite Yamashita's 28-page brief having been described as being of "solid professional quality" and containing legal strategies that are "quite original,"
the Supreme Court's unanimous decision was that he was not eligible to be an American, and therefore could not practice law.  This decision was overturned, posthumously, nearly 100 years later on March 1, 2001.

In 1922, Yamashita again entered legal waters when he appealed an alien land law prohibiting Asians from owning property.  Washington's attorney general maintained that in order for Japanese people to fit in, their "marked physical characteristics" would have to be destroyed, that "the Negro, the Indian and the Chinaman" had already demonstrated assimilation was not possible for them.  The U.S. Supreme Court heard the case Takuji Yamashita v. Hinkle, but affirmed the prohibition. Washington's Alien Land Law would not be repealed until 1966.

Afterwards, Yamashita managed restaurants and hotels in Seattle and Bremerton and an oyster business in Silverdale. During World War II, after the signing of Executive Order 9066, Yamashita and his wife were interned, losing virtually everything they owned.  With his family, he was incarcerated at Tule Lake, Manzanar, and Minidoka before returning to Seattle.  In 1957, following the death of his daughter Martha, Yamashita and his wife returned to Japan where he died less than two years later.

References 

1874 births
1959 deaths
American activists
Japanese-American civil rights activists
University of Washington School of Law alumni
Japanese-American internees
Japanese emigrants to the United States
People from Yawatahama, Ehime